Ubiquitin-conjugating enzyme E2 R2 is a protein that in humans is encoded by the UBE2R2 gene.

Protein kinase CK2 is a ubiquitous and pleiotropic Ser/Thr protein kinase involved in cell growth and transformation. This gene encodes a protein similar to the E2 ubiquitin conjugating enzyme UBC3/CDC34. Studies suggest that CK2-dependent phosphorylation of this ubiquitin-conjugating enzyme functions by regulating beta-TrCP substrate recognition and induces its interaction with beta-TrCP, enhancing beta-catenin degradation.

References

Further reading